Sandhøkalvane Nunataks is a group of nunataks located  northeast of Sandhø Heights, lying between the Conrad Mountains and Mount Dallmann in Queen Maud Land. They were discovered and photographed by the German Antarctic Expedition in 1938–39, and mapped by Norway from air photos and surveys by the Norwegian Antarctic Expedition, 1956–60, and named Sandhøkalvane ("the sand heights calves").

References

Nunataks of Queen Maud Land
Princess Astrid Coast